Peabody Library could refer to 

 Peabody Institute Library, a library at Johns Hopkins University in Baltimore, Maryland.
 Peabody Library (Thetford, Vermont)
 Peabody Institute Library (Peabody, Massachusetts)
 Peabody Township Library, a library in Peabody, Kansas